The 2011 Hungaroring GP3 Series round was a GP3 Series motor race held on July 30 and 31, 2011 at Hungaroring, Hungary. It was the sixth round of the 2011 GP3 Series. The race supported the 2011 Hungarian Grand Prix.

Classification

Race 1

Notes
 – Sims was Disqualified from Race 1 results because his car did not comply with the technical regulations.

Race 2

Notes
 – Dillmann received a twenty-second penalty after the race for not respecting the track limits and gaining an advantage whilst trying to overtake under yellow waved flags.

Standings after the round

Drivers' Championship standings

Teams' Championship standings

 Note: Only the top five positions are included for both sets of standings.

See also 
 2011 Hungarian Grand Prix
 2011 Hungaroring GP2 Series round

References

External links
GP3 Series official website: Results

Hungarian
GP3